The  ("Corpus of Semitic Inscriptions", abbreviated CIS) is a collection of ancient inscriptions in Semitic languages produced since the end of 2nd millennium BC until the rise of Islam. It was published in Latin. In a note recovered after his death, Ernest Renan stated that: "Of all I have done, it is the Corpus I like the most."

The first part was published in 1881, fourteen years after the beginning of the project. Renan justified the fourteen year delay in the preface to the volume, pointing to the calamity of the Franco-Prussian war and the difficulties that arose in the printing the Phoenician characters, whose first engraving was proven incorrect in light of the inscriptions discovered subsequently. A smaller collection –  ("Repertory of Semitic Epigraphy", abbreviated RES) – was subsequently created to present the Semitic inscriptions without delay and in a deliberately concise way as they became known, and was published in French rather than Latin.

The publication of the series continued until 1962.

History and scope
The Academy considered that as a French institution it was best placed to collate the whole of Semitic epigraphy, due to France's then domination of North Africa, its historic relations with Egypt, Syria, and Greece, the numerous Semitic monuments in French museums, and the number of leading French Semitic scholars including Jean-Jacques Barthélemy who first deciphered the Phoenician script. 

It was decided that the collection should contain all the ancient inscriptions written in "Semitic characters", excluding the Semitic cuneiform inscriptions, nor other scripts from the same regions. The time period was unlimited on the furthest age of the incriptions, whereas the nearest age was to be limited by the beginning of standardized epigraphy of medieval Arabic, Hebrew and Syriac. It was to include all known inscriptions, engraved stones, coins and papyri, along with selected specimens of particularly important later manuscripts.

The original plan of the work to produce ten books: 
I. Phoenician and Punic; 
II.  Hebrew language and  Samaritan language, facsimiles of ancient Hebrew and Samaritan manuscripts; 
III  Aramaic language; 
IV. Palmyrene; See inscriptions Nabatean; 
V. Syriac language; 
VII. in Mandaic language; 
VIII. early Arabic; 
IX. Himyaritic; 
X. Amharic language

The program was then divided into five parts, based on the dividing names used in Semitic palaeography. Within each part it was to be subdivided based on geographic location:

Part I. Phoenician, Punic and neo-Punic inscriptions; 
Part II. Aramaic, Palmyra, Nabatean inscriptions; 
Part III. Hebrew inscriptions; 
Part IV. Himyaritic, Sabaean; 
Part V. Saracen, Lihyan, Safaitic and Thamudic.

The  (abbreviated RES) published inscriptions during intermediate periods.

Volumes
Corpus Inscriptionum ab Academia Inscriptionum et Litterarum Humaniorum conditum atque Digestum. Parisiis: E Reipublicae Typographeo, 1881-1962

Part I. Phoenician, Punic and neo-Punic inscriptions. This series brought together the Phoenician inscriptions found in Phoenicia itself, in Cyprus, in Egypt, in Greece, in Malta, in Sicily, in Sardinia, in Italy, in Gaul, in Spain, and in particular the vast number of North African Punic inscriptions, particularly from Carthage. Renan continued to edit this series until his death in 1892.
 Pars 1, Tomus 1: : Fasc. 1 (1881) [= inscriptions CIS I 1-164] and : Tabulæ (images)  [= inscriptions CIS I 1-437];
 Pars 1, Tomus 1: Fasc. 2 (1883); 
 Pars 1, Tomus 1: Fasc. 3 (1885);
 Pars 1, Tomus 1: Fasc. 4 (1887);
 Pars 1, Tomus 2:  Fasc. 1 (1890) (= CIS I 438-906); 
 Pars 1, Tomus 2:  Fasc. 2 (1899) [= CIS I 906-1901]; and  Tabulæ (images);
 Pars 1, Tomus 2:  Fasc. 3  (1908) [= CIS I 1902-2592]; and  Tabulæ (images);
 Pars 1, Tomus 2:  Fasc. 4  (1911) [= CIS I 2593-3251]; and  Tabulæ (images);
 Pars 1, Tomus 3: Fasc. 1; Tabulae (images):  (1926)

Part II. Aramaic, Palmyra, Nabatean inscriptions. Edited by Eugène-Melchior de Vogüé, this series began publication in 1889, covering the territory of the ancient Syrian kingdoms, as well as all the countries where Aramaic penetrated under the Persian empire, from Anatolia to the India, from the Caspian to Upper Egypt.
 Pars 2, Tomus 1:  (1889) [= CIS II 1-348]; and  Tabulæ (images);
 Pars 2, Tomus 2, Fasc 1:  (1907) [= CIS II 1472-3233]; and  Tabulæ
 Pars 2, Tomus 3: Fasc. 1 (1951)   Tabulæ (images);

Part III. Hebrew inscriptions; this series was not published. However, a number of Hebrew inscriptions were systematically published in the Répertoire d'Épigraphie Sémitique.

Part IV. Himyaritic, Sabaean. This volume, first published in 1889, was edited by Joseph Derenbourg. It covers the Arabian Peninsula, particularly the Himyarite and Sabean inscriptions.
 Pars 4, Tomus 1:  Fasc. 4 (1889) [= CIS IV 1-362]; and  Tabulae (images)
 Pars 4, Tomus 2, Fasc 1:  Tabulae (images)
 Pars 4, Tomus 2, Fasc 2:  Tabulae (images)
 Pars 4, Tomus 2, Fasc 3+4: (1920)  Tabulae (images)
 Pars 4, Tomus 3, Fasc 2, Tabulae (images): 

Part V. Saracen, Lihyan, Safaitic and Thamudic; this series was not published until 1950, by Gonzague Ryckmans
 Pars 5, Tomus 1, Fasc 1: (1950)

Répertoire d'Épigraphie Sémitique 
 Volume 1:  (1900–05) [= inscriptions RES 1-500] under the direction of Charles Simon Clermont-Ganneau, as assistant to Jean-Baptiste Chabot
 Volume 2:  (1907–14) [= RES 501-1200] edited by Jean-Baptiste Chabot
 Volumes 3-8 were edited by Jean-Baptiste Chabot until his death in 1948, then Jacques Ryckmans until the last volume in 1968.

Leadership
List of presidents of the "Commission du Corpus Inscriptionum Semiticarum":
 Ernest Renan (d.1892)
 Hartwig Derenbourg (d.1908)
 René Dussaud (d.1958)
 Jean-Baptiste Chabot (d.1948)
 André Dupont-Sommer (d.1983)
 André Caquot (d.2004)

Gallery

See also
 Kanaanäische und Aramäische Inschriften
 Corpus Inscriptionum Iudaeae/Palaestinae

Notes

References
 1867 Initiation: Renan Ernest. Rapport fait à l'Académie des Inscriptions et Belles-Lettres par la commission spéciale chargée de l'examen du projet d'un Corpus inscriptionum semiticarum. In: Comptes rendus des séances de l'Académie des Inscriptions et Belles-Lettres, 11e année, 1867. pp. 77–85:
 Académie des Inscriptions et Belles-Lettres, CORPUS INSCRIPTIONUM SEMITICARUM CABINET  
 René DUSSAUD, La nouvelle Académie des Inscriptions et Belles-Lettres (1795-1914), 2 volumes I et II, Paris, P. Geuthner, 1946–1947, p. 289, 425, 745, 748 entre autres.
 André DUPONT-SOMMER, « Renan et le Corpus des Inscriptions sémitiques », Comptes rendus des séances de l'Académie, 1968/4, Paris, Académie des Inscriptions et Belles-Lettres, p. 3-14.
 André CAQUOT, « L'épigraphie sémitique. Discours de clôture de l'Année épigraphique », Comptes rendus des séances de l'Académie, 1988/3, Paris, Académie des Inscriptions et Belles-Lettres, p 10–15.
 Jean LECLANT, « Une tradition : l'épigraphie à l'Académie des Inscriptions et Belles-Lettres », Comptes rendus des séances de l'Académie, 1988/4, Paris, Académie des Inscriptions et Belles-Lettres, p. 3-21.
 Françoise Briquel Chatonnet, Catherine Fauveaud-Brassaud. Ad majorem scientiae fructum. Le Corpus inscriptionum semiticarum dans les correspondances conservées à l'Institut de France. C. Bonnet et V. Krings. S'écrire et écrire sur l'Antiquité. L'apport des correspondances à l'histoire des travaux scientifiques, Jérôme Millon, pp. 215–228, 2008. hal-00334567

Epigraphy
Archaeological corpora
Phoenician language
Punic language
Textual scholarship
Aramaic inscriptions
Phoenician inscriptions
19th-century Latin books
20th-century Latin books
1867 establishments in France
1962 disestablishments in France